The following is a list of all stations of the Yerevan Metro:

Name Changes
Some stations have changed names over the years.

Stations

See also

 Transport in Armenia
 Yerevan Metro
 Yerevan

References

Lists of metro stations
 
 
Metro stations